The 1971 Charlotte Tennis Classic, also known by its sponsored name North Carolina National Bank Open,  was a combined men's and women's tennis tournament played on outdoor clay courts  at the Olde Providence Racquet Club in Charlotte, North Carolina in the United States.. The men's competition was part of group C the 1971 Grand Prix circuit while the women's competition was a non-tour amateur event without prize money. It was the inaugural edition of the tournament and was held from April 12 through April 18, 1971 Arthur Ashe won the men's singles title, earning $5,000 first-prize money, and Chris Evert won the women's title.

Finals

Men's singles
 Arthur Ashe defeated  Stan Smith 6–3, 6–3

Women's singles
 Chris Evert defeated  Laura duPont 6–2, 6–0

Men's doubles
 Marty Riessen /  Tony Roche defeated  Arthur Ashe /  Dennis Ralston 6–2, 6–2

Women's doubles
 Chris Evert /  Sue Stap defeated  Janet Newberry /  Eliza Pande 6–3, 1–6, 6–3

References

Charlotte Tennis Classic
Charlotte Tennis Classic
Charlotte Tennis Classic
Charlotte Tennis Classic